George Barrie (9 February 1912 – 16 November 2002) was the owner and CEO of Fabergé Inc. from 1964 to 1984. He was nominated for two Oscars for Best Original Song and created the cologne Brut. Though not one of the first to use celebrities to advertise, he was one of those that made it commonplace.

Biography 
Born in New York City and raised in Pittsfield, Massachusetts, he trained to be a musician.  But in need of steady work, Barrie took a salesman job with the hair products company Rayette during the 1930s.

Rayette and Barrie purchased the perfume and hair-care company Fabergé Inc. for $26 million in 1964, and the Brut line began achieving international success soon after.

Barrie was considered to be a pioneer in the area of celebrity endorsements, as he wooed stars such as Cary Grant, Farrah Fawcett, Joe Namath, Roger Moore, Muhammad Ali, Margaux Hemingway and Laurence Harvey to pitch company products.

Barrie and his Brut Productions produced the very successful film A Touch of Class (1973), which starred Glenda Jackson and George Segal, as well as Night Watch, Whiffs (1975), Sweet Hostage (1975), Thieves (1977), Nasty Habits (1977), and Fingers (1978).

Barrie and Sammy Cahn were nominated for the 1975 Academy Award for Best Original Song, after writing "Now That We're In Love." Barrie and Cahn had been nominated in the same category in 1973, for "All That Love Went To Waste."

Trivia 
Annual Straw Hat Awards – Party by Fabergé June 16, 1970 at the George Barrie Townhouse with Bette Davis

References

External links 
 Biography at slick.org
 

American film producers
American retail chief executives
1912 births
2002 deaths